is a side-scrolling 2D platform video game released in 1993 for the Super Nintendo Entertainment System. It was originally developed by Visual Concepts, and funded by publisher Electronic Arts, but eventually published by Hi Tech Expressions.

Gameplay

The player controls Harley, a man in a green suit who has shrunk himself to the size of a bar of soap. Harley's mission is to gather the parts of his shrinking machine to return himself to normal size. Harley advances through the levels, picking up items such as tacks, rubberbands, and marbles. Harley adventures through his lab, where the initial incident occurs, his kitchen, his toy room, where the player pilots a toy tank by himself, his bathroom, and other stages.

Enemies include flies, bees, and ants. Players must avoid such enemy attacks as the flies vomiting overhead. The main boss is a deformed rat that tries to jump on Harley, and after each encounter utilizes a household item for the limb he had lost in the previous encounter.

Development
Visually, the game utilizes a mix of pixel art for the stage backgrounds, the menus and most objects, and digitized clay animation models for all characters. The clay animation was produced by A-OK Animation, who had also worked on Claymates, another Super NES game featuring a somewhat similar graphical style. 

The game was programmed, and designed in part, by Brian Greenstone of Pangea Software. This programmer previously wrote games for the Apple IIGS computer, which happens to share the same 65C816 microprocessor as the Super NES.

The box art was created for EA by veteran gaming illustrator Marc Ericksen. It features Harley blasting out of the kitchen sink, holding a red plastic push pin for scale reference.

Reception

Notes

References

External links

1993 video games
Altron games
Hi Tech Expressions games
Science fiction video games
Super Nintendo Entertainment System games
Super Nintendo Entertainment System-only games
Platform games
Side-scrolling video games
Clay animation video games
Video games developed in the United States
Video games scored by Brian L. Schmidt
Video games with digitized sprites
Video games about size change
Action video games
Single-player video games
Video games about toys